Avrai ragione tu (Ritratto) is a single of the Italian rapper Caparezza, the fourth excerpt from the sixth studio album Museica and published November 14, 2014.

The Song
Second track of Museica, You're right (Portrait) is inspired by the picture of Dmitri Vrubel My God, Help Me to Survive This Deadly Love.

Personnel
 Caparezza – Voice, Rapping
 Alfredo Ferrero – Guitar
 Giovanni Astorino – bass guitar, cello
 Gaetano Camporeale – Electronic keyboard
 Emanuele Petruzzella – Piano
 Rino Corrieri – Drum kit
 Pantaleo Gadaleta, Serena Soccoia – violins
 Francesco Capuano – Viola
 Giuliano Teofrasto – Trumpet
 Angelantonio De Pinto – Trombone
 Luigi Tridente – Saxophone
 Giuseppe Smaldino – Horn, Tuba
 Floriana Casiero, Rossella Antonacci, Luigi Nardiello, Antonio Minervini, Simone Martorana, Valeria Quarto, Nicola Quarto – choirs

2014 songs